Klondyke School District 9 is a school district in Graham County, Arizona. The district is part of a consortium run by the Graham County Superintendent of Education.

References

External links
 

School districts in Graham County, Arizona